Joseph Darnand (19 March 1897 – 10 October 1945) was a French collaborator with Nazi Germany during World War II. A decorated soldier in the French Army of World War I and early World War II, he went on to become the organizer and de facto leader of the Milice française, or French Militia, the collaborationist Vichy government's paramilitary police force. Darnand also served as an officer in the Waffen-SS. He was tried and executed after the war for treason.

Early years and war service
Darnand was born at Coligny, Ain, Rhône-Alpes in France.

On 8 January 1916, he enlisted in the 35th Infantry Regiment. He was promoted to corporal in April 1917, sergeant on 1 June 1917 and to adjutant (warrant officer) in 1918. He volunteered for a squadron that undertook dangerous missions. For his efforts in July 1918 penetrating German lines in the Champagne sector with a small force that captured prisoners and secured information about a forthcoming German offensive, "Darnand emerged a major war hero."

Demobilised after the armistice, he again enlisted for two years in the army in September 1919. After a stint in the army of occupation in Germany, he participated in the campaign against the forces of Kemal Atatürk in Cilicia. He ended his service in July 1921 as a sub-lieutenant (second lieutenant). He worked as a cabinetmaker and later founded his own transportation company in Nice.

Between the wars, Darnand joined a number of far-right political, paramilitary organizations: l'Action Française in 1925, the Croix-de-Feu in 1928, La Cagoule and Jacques Doriot's French Popular Party (PPF) in 1936. He formed his own Fascist outfit, the Chevaliers du Glaive (Knights of the Sword); in the 1930s he became prominent among La Cagoule, or the Cagoulards ("Hooded Men"), a secret terrorist group that organised bombings and assassinations, and that stored arms in depots all over France.

Vichy collaborator
At the beginning of World War II, Darnand volunteered to join the French Army and was commissioned as a lieutenant. He served in the Maginot Line and was decorated for bravery. During the Phoney War he took part in several commando actions against German forces. He was captured in June 1940 but fled to Nice. He became a leading figure in the Vichy French organization Légion française des combattants (French Legion of Veterans) and recruited troopers for the fight against "Bolshevism".

The next year, he founded the collaborationist militia, Service d'ordre légionnaire (SOL), that supported Philippe Pétain and Vichy France. He offered his help against the French Resistance. On 1 January 1943 he transformed the organization into the Milice. Although Pierre Laval was its official president, Darnand was its de facto leader. Darnand's political convictions were of the far right but he was known as a Germanophobe. Nonetheless, his views toward Nazi Germany changed. By the spring of 1941 he had told a friend that "France had been wrong to fight Germany in 1939" and Germany's assault on the Soviet Union in June of that year "reinforced Darnand's evolution toward collaboration."

SS officer
After failing to join the Resistance, Darnand definitively turned to Nazi Germany and the next month was made an officer of the SS. Darnand's turn to the SS was also influenced by the fact that miliciens were being targeted for assassination by the Resistance but Vichy and Wehrmacht authorities refused to arm the Milice.

In joining the SS, Darnand took a personal oath of loyalty to Adolf Hitler, receiving a rank of Untersturmführer (Second Lieutenant) in the Waffen SS in August 1943. In December 1943, he became head of police and later secretary of the interior. Joseph Darnand expanded the Milice and by 1944 it had over 35,000 members. The organization played an important role in investigating the French Resistance; as time progressed it "became ever more unrestrained," carrying out assassinations, chasing resisters, and "enthusiastically . . . rounding up Jews." In early 1944 Vichy announced a new law empowering Darnand "to create special courts martial to try on the spot" persons caught in violent acts against the state. The law was "without precedent in modern French legal history." The Milice also aided German forces in combat against the Resistance, and Darnand himself commanded a Milice unit in March 1944 near Lyons that flushed out some maquisards (French Resistance guerilla fighters). After the Normandy Invasion and Allied advance, Darnand fled to Germany in September 1944 and joined the pro-Nazi puppet government in the Sigmaringen enclave. He received a promotion to Sturmbannführer on 1 November 1944.

Capture, trial and execution

In April 1945, he fled from Sigmaringen to Meran in Northern Italy. He was captured by the British in Italy on 25 June 1945 and taken back to France, where he was sentenced to death on 3 October 1945 and executed by firing squad on 10 October 1945 at the Fort de Châtillon. Like some other collaboration leaders, Darnand had been "found guilty of 'collaboration with the enemy.'"

References

1897 births
1945 deaths
People from Coligny, Ain
People affiliated with Action Française
French Popular Party politicians
French military personnel of World War I
French Army personnel of World War II
SS-Sturmbannführer
Police misconduct in France
French Waffen-SS personnel
Officiers of the Légion d'honneur
Recipients of the Croix de Guerre 1914–1918 (France)
Recipients of the Croix de guerre (Belgium)
French politicians convicted of crimes
Nazi collaborators shot at the Fort de Châtillon
Executed politicians
Executed people from Rhône-Alpes
Burials at Batignolles Cemetery